Elite Model Look International 2013 was held on November 27, 2013, in Shenzhen, China. The winner of the title was Eva Klimkova of the Czech Republic, announced by Malgosia Bela, Liu Wen and Elite Model Look 2005 Charlotte Di Calypso.

Placements

Contestants

References

External links

Fashion events in China
2010s fashion
2013 in China
2013 in fashion
Shenzhen